Podkonice is a village and municipality in Banská Bystrica District in the Banská Bystrica Region of central Slovakia.

Etymology
Slovak konica (archaic) - a stable or a shelter for shoeing horses. Podkonica - a nearby location. Koknicze 1340, Podkonicze 1441, Potkonycz 1528, Potkonicz 1773, Podkonice 1920.

History
In historical records the village was first mentioned in 1340.

Geography
The municipality lies at an altitude of 529 metres and covers an area of 28.476 km2. It has a population of about 877 people.

References

External links
 https://web.archive.org/web/20110817033906/http://www.podkonice.sk/index1.htm

Villages and municipalities in Banská Bystrica District